Leopoldo Rodés (born 7 February 1939) is a Spanish former swimmer. He competed in the men's 100 metre freestyle at the 1960 Summer Olympics.

References

External links
 

1939 births
Living people
Olympic swimmers of Spain
Swimmers at the 1960 Summer Olympics
Swimmers from Barcelona
Spanish male freestyle swimmers